The P45 Express (codenamed Eaglelake) is a mainstream desktop computer chipset from Intel released in Q2 2008. The first mainboards featuring the P45 chipset were shown at CeBIT 2008.

The P45 Express chipset supports Intel's LGA 775 socket and Core 2 Duo and Quad processors. It is a 65 nm chipset, compared to the earlier generation chipsets (P35, X38, X48) which were 90 nm.

Features 
 1333/1066/800 MT/s front-side bus (FSB), most motherboard manufacturers claim support up to 1600 MT/s.
 PCI Express 2.0, 1 ×16 or 2 ×8 in CrossFire configuration.
 Dual-channel DDR2 memory
 up to 16 GiB addressable memory; officially up to 800 MHz, most motherboard manufacturers claim support up to 1200 MHz
 Dual-channel DDR3 memory
 up to 8 GiB addressable memory; officially up 1066 MHz, most motherboard manufacturers claim support up to 1333 MHz
 ICH10 / ICH10R southbridge
 Supports 45 nm processors

See also 
 List of Intel chipsets

References

External links
P45 Express Chipset
82P45 Memory Controller Hub
Intel P45 Express Chipset Overview

P45